The Harington Baronetcy, of Ridlington in the county of Rutland, is a title in the Baronetage of England. It was created on 29 June 1611 for James Harington. He was a descendant of John Harington, one of the Barons summoned to Parliament by Edward II. James's elder brother was John Harington, 1st Baron Harington of Exton. The second Baronet was a Royalist during the English Civil War. The third Baronet was a Major-General in the Parliamentarian Army and one of the judges appointed to try Charles I, although he refused to sit. He was nonetheless excepted from the Indemnity and Oblivion Act and his title was forfeited for life in 1661. The ninth and twelfth Baronets were both judges.

Sir Charles Robert Harington (1897–1972), son of Reverend Charles Harington, second son of the eleventh Baronet, was Professor of Chemical Pathology at the University of London and Director of the National Institute for Medical Research. John Harington (1873–1943), fifth son of the eleventh Baronet, was a Brigadier-General in the British Army. David Gawen Champernowne (1912–2000), great-grandson of Arthur Champernowne (who assumed the surname of Champernowne in 1774), son of Reverend Richard Harington, second son of the sixth Baronet, was Professor of Statistics at the University of Oxford from 1948 to 1959 and Professor of Economics and Statistics at the University of Cambridge from 1970 to 1978. The second son of the current baronet is the actor Christopher "Kit" Harington, b. 1986.

Harington baronets, of Ridlington (1611)
Sir James Harrington, 1st Baronet (1542–1614)
Sir Edward Harrington, 2nd Baronet (died 1653)
Sir James Harington, 3rd Baronet (1607–1680) (baronetcy forfeited for life 1661)
Sir Edmund Harington, 4th Baronet (–1708)
Sir Edward Harington, 5th Baronet (1639–1716), brother of the 4th Baronet
Sir James Harington, 6th Baronet (died 1782), grandnephew of the 5th Baronet
Sir James Harington, 7th Baronet (1726–1793)
Sir John Edward Harington, 8th Baronet (1760–1831)
Sir James Harington, 9th Baronet (1788–1835)
Sir John Edward Harington, 10th Baronet (1821–1877)
Sir Richard Harington, 11th Baronet (1835–1911), first cousin of the 10th Baronet
Sir Richard Harington, 12th Baronet (3 March 1861 – 1 February 1931). Harington was the eldest son of Sir Richard Harington, 11th Baronet, and was educated at Eton and Christ Church, Oxford. Called to the Bar in 1886, he practised as a barrister on the Oxford Circuit before taking up an appointment as a Puisne Judge in the High Court of Justice at Fort William in Bengal in 1899, where he served in that capacity until returning home in 1913 – and qualified for his Delhi Durbar Medals. He had, meanwhile, served in the London Brigade of the Royal Naval Artillery Volunteers from 1880 to 1891, and had commanded the Artillery Company of the Calcutta Port Defence Volunteers from 1900 to 1909. He volunteered for the Royal Naval Volunteer Reserve on the outbreak of the First World War in 1914, aged 53. He was promoted to the rank of Chief Petty Officer in the Anti-Aircraft Corps, in which capacity he served until 1916. A onetime Justice of the Peace and Deputy Lieutenant for Herefordshire, he was appointed High Sheriff of Herefordshire in 1918 and died in February 1931, having succeeded to his father's title in 1911.
Sir Richard Dundas Harington, 13th Baronet (1900–1981)
Sir Nicholas John Harington, 14th Baronet (1942–2016), nephew of the 13th Baronet
Sir David Richard Harington, 15th Baronet (born 1944)

The heir apparent to the baronetcy is the present holder's elder son John "Jack" Catesby Harington (born 1984). Sir David Harington is also the father of the actor Kit Harington.

Footnotes

References
 Ian Grimble's The Harington Family published by Jonathan Cape, London 1957
 John Taplin Shakespeare's Granddaughter and the Bagleys of Dudley published by the Black Country Society June 2005 (Originally published in 38/4, 39/1 and 39/2 of The Blackcountryman).
 . This reference includes some of the dates and is the sole reference for Baronet 10 to 13. It is also the ref for 14, confirmed by The Official Roll of the Baronets.
Kidd, Charles & Williamson, David (editors). Debrett's Peerage and Baronetage (1990 edition). New York: St Martin's Press, 1990,

External links
Obituary of Sir Charles Harington
Obituary of David Champernowne

 

Harington
1611 establishments in England
People from Rutland
Harington family